Marina van Zyl is a South African politician from the Democratic Alliance and member of the National Assembly of South Africa. In August 2022, she joined the Committee on Basic Education.

References

See also 

Living people
Year of birth missing (living people)
Democratic Alliance (South Africa) politicians
Members of the National Assembly of South Africa
Women members of the National Assembly of South Africa
21st-century South African women politicians

21st-century South African politicians